The Poma 2000 in Laon, France, was an automated guideway transit, a cable-driven people mover which ran between the railway station and the city hall.

History
The system opened in 1989, replacing a former tram line (1899–1971), that used a rack for braking but not propulsion. There were three stations. The cars ran on rubber tyres on a metallic track at a 2.5 min headway. The maximum capacity was 900 passengers/hour, and most recent ridership before its closure was about 1500 passengers/day.

The system ran every day from 7:00 a.m. to 8:00 p.m. from Monday to Saturday and every day in Summer. A complete journey on the line from Gare to Hôtel de Ville took 3.5 min.

Citing €19 million maintenance costs and rising local taxes, the Agglomeration Community of Pays de Laon ended the service on 27 August 2016.

Route

See also
 List of rapid transit systems

References

External links

 poma - Images of the Poma 2000

Rapid transit in France
Laon
Rubber-tyred metros
1989 establishments in France
2016 disestablishments in France
Railway lines opened in 1989
Railway lines closed in 2016
Transport in Hauts-de-France
Cable car railways